Lurch is an EP by Steel Pole Bath Tub, released in 1990 by Boner Records.

Track listing

Personnel 
Adapted from the Lurch liner notes.

Steel Pole Bath Tub
 Dale Flattum – bass guitar, vocals
 Mike Morasky (as Mike Malmsteen) – guitar, vocals
 Darren Morey (as D.K. Mor-X) – drums
Additional musicians
 Jennifer DeFrancis – additional vocals (A1)

Production and additional personnel
 Billy Anderson – assistant engineering
 Jonathan Burnside – engineering
 Frank Grow – photography
 Steel Pole Bath Tub – production

Release history

References

External links 
 

1990 EPs
Boner Records albums
Steel Pole Bath Tub albums